It's VENA (Live) is a live extended play by Bachata trio Vena. It was released on September 18, 2015, by Planet Records and Element Music Group. It is based on their best hits perform live. It contains 6 tracks, 5 live and 1 studio. The one studio song is the single "Dile A El", which peaked at #16 in the Billboard Tropical Airplay chart. A live version is also featured. The EP peaked at #10 in the Billboard Tropical Albums chart.

Track listing
Track numbers 1 to 5 are live.

Charts

References

2015 EPs
Bachata albums